Pieter baron Melvill van Carnbee (2 April 1743, Dordrecht – 17 May 1826, The Hague) was a Dutch naval officer from a military family of Scottish descent, who rose to the rank of vice admiral. His name was sometimes spelled Melville van Carnbée. His grandson Pieter Melvill van Carnbee (1816-1856) was a notable geographer.

Life
He is most noted for his involvement in the 1781 Battle of Cape St Mary. In 1793 Melvill van Carnbee (by then a Schout-bij-nacht) was made commander of the squadron on the Meuse (Maas) and the Hollands Diep. He also had to oversee the Dutch line of defence and the major rivers whilst French troops under Charles Pichegru were advancing. However, in winter 1795, the rivers froze over and Melvill's ships were trapped, meaning he could do nothing to prevent the French from conquering Holland, Utrecht and Zeeland. A supporter of the Prince of Orange, he left the navy on 24 February 1795 after the formation of the Batavian Republic

Melvill was later released from his oath by William V, Prince of Orange and on 16 July 1806 king Louis Bonaparte made him Staatsraad in charge of the navy section, as well as a Commander of the Order of the Union. According to a letter in the Daendels family archive, Melvil was at that moment (on 17 February 1807) "aux Grandes Indes", that is in the Dutch East Indies. in 1809 he was made a Secretary of State. From 30 November 1811 to 1 January 1813 he was 'President of the Assembly of the 's-Gravenhage Canton' in the First French Empire.

In 1814 Melvill returned to the navy itself after the formation of the Kingdom of the Netherlands. On 8 July 1815 William I of the Netherlands, in his decree number 16 on "past services", made Melvil a Commander of the Military William Order. In Melvil's case the "past services" being rewarded were loyalty to William I's father William V and the 1781 frigate action. He also served as a member of the Dutch Council of State. On 16 September 1815 he was raised to the Dutch peerage and on 6 May 1822 awarded the title of baron.

Bibliography
  J.C. de Jonge, Geschiedenis van het Nederlandsche zeewezen, part 6 (3rd edition, Zwolle 1869)
  J.C. Mollema, Geschiedenis van Nederland ter zee, part 3 (Amsterdam, 1941
  H.A. van Karnebeek, "Levensschets van den viceadmiraal A.W. de Man", 's-Gravenhage 1861
  Luc Eckhout, "Het admiralenboek", Amsterdam 1992
  O. Schutte, "De Orde van de Unie", Zutphen 1985

Sources
The 1781 battle

1743 births
1810 deaths
Royal Netherlands Navy admirals
Dutch people of Scottish descent
People from Dordrecht
Pieter
18th-century Dutch military personnel